Piz Laschadurella is a mountain in the Sesvenna Range of the Alps, located east of Zernez in the canton of Graubünden. Its southern side is part of the Swiss National Park.

References

External links
 Piz Laschadurella on Hikr

Mountains of the Alps
Mountains of Switzerland
Alpine three-thousanders
Mountains of Graubünden
Scuol
Zernez